Cristian Ionuț Bud (born 26 June 1985) is a Romanian professional footballer who plays as a striker for CS Făurei.

Career

Early years
In 2004, Bud began his career with his hometown club Liberty Salonta after being bought from Sporting Baia Mare's Academy. In the same year, he started playing with the senior side scoring vital goals in 52 appearances and scoring 25 goals. In his last season with the club, they managed to promote to Liga 1 after years in the second division.

Gaz Metan Mediaș
Following the success at Liberty, in 2009–2010 season, Bud signed a two years contract with Gaz Metan Mediaș for a fee of 500,000 Euro, becoming their most expensive ever player. Bud was a regular starter in his stint at the club scoring 11 goals in Liga 1 helping the club stay in the first division.

CFR Cluj
In December 2010, Bud was bought by CFR Cluj becoming a very important player for the club. In his first season, he won the Romanian Championship and the Romanian Cup. After missing most of the 2011 season due to injury, Bud was loaned back to Gaz Metan Medias scoring 6 times for them.

Bihor Oradea
In 2013, Bud was loaned to FC Bihor Oradea making 10 appearances and scoring 7 goals in all competitions.

Debrecen
In 2013 he signed with Hungarian champions Debrecen becoming their first summer signing.
Not being able to accommodate himself with the life in Hungary, Bud decided to end the contract by mutual consent going back to Gaz Metan Medias.

Return to Gaz Metan Mediaș
In the summer of 2013, Bud returned to the club again signing a one-year contract. Although most of the year he missed games because of an injury, Bud managed to make 10 appearances for the club scoring 5 goals.

Pandurii Târgu Jiu
At the insistence of the coach, Cristian Pustai, Bud signed a two-year contract with the Liga 1 club making 6 appearances for the club.

Milsami Orhei
After ending its contract with Pandurii Targu Jiu, Bud signed a three-year deal with the Moldovan Champions Milsami Orhei. In his first season, he made 20 appearances for the club and managed to eliminate Ludogorets Razgrad in the second qualifying round of the 2015–16 UEFA Champions League and winning the Moldovan Championship. In his two-years with the club, Bud managed to score 16 goals in 37 appearances.

Return to CFR Cluj
After two successful seasons in Moldova, Bud signed with his former team CFR Cluj becoming the club's top scorer with 16 goals in 41 appearances.

Poli Timișoara
At the beginning of 2017, it was announced that Bud signed a contract with Poli Timișoara for an undisclosed fee. Bud went on to play five times and because of differences with the club's financial status, Bud decided to end his contract with the club.

Concordia Chiajna
In the summer of 2017, he signed with Concordia Chiajna becoming their first summer signing being a priority transfer for the coach Vasile Miriuță. His first goal for the club came in a win against Juventus București.

Hermannstadt / Third spell at CFR Cluj
In February 2019, he returned to CFR Cluj.

Turris-Oltul Turnu Măgurele
On 28 June 2019 Bud signed a contract with Liga II side Turris-Oltul Turnu Măgurele.

Honours

Club
Liberty Salonta
 Divizia B: 2005–06
 Liga III: 2006–07

CFR Cluj
 Liga I: 2009–10, 2018–19
 Romanian Cup: 2009–10, 2015–16
 Romanian Supercup: 2010

Milsami Orhei
 Divizia Națională: 2014–15

Individual
Digi Sport Player of the Month: September 2016

References

 INTERVIU. Cristi Bud: "Eu sunt propriul meu idol". ziuadecj.realitatea.net 
 Interviu / Cristi Bud: "Ţin demult cu CFR-ul”. adevarul.ro 
 GALERIE FOTO Cristi Bud a lăsat pentru o zi fotbalul și a făcut show sub panoul de baschet în centrul Timișoarei!. gsp.ro 
 Cel mai bun marcator din Liga 1 s-a săturat să nu mai prindă lotul. "Nu mai continui din vară. Nu sunt dorit!". Miriuţă: "E vorba de lipsă de formă...". prosport.ro 
 Golgheter de vânzare. Cristi Bud poate părăsi Gruia în această iarnă. actualdecluj.ro 
 Cristi Bud a revenit la CFR Cluj, după ce a jucat la Milsami Orhei, în Moldova. digisport.ro 
 Bud nu pleacă de la CFR: "Nu ne dăm golgheterul pentru o garsonieră în Cluj". click.ro

External links

Cristian Bud at theplayersagent.com

Sportspeople from Baia Mare
1985 births
Living people
Romanian footballers
Association football forwards
Liga II players
CS Minaur Baia Mare (football) players
CF Liberty Oradea players
FC Bihor Oradea players
Liga I players
CFR Cluj players
CS Gaz Metan Mediaș players
ACS Poli Timișoara players
CS Concordia Chiajna players
FC Hermannstadt players
AFC Turris-Oltul Turnu Măgurele players
FC Dunărea Călărași players
Nemzeti Bajnokság I players
Debreceni VSC players
Moldovan Super Liga players
FC Milsami Orhei players
Swiss Promotion League players
Yverdon-Sport FC players
Liga III players
Romanian expatriate footballers
Expatriate footballers in Hungary
Romanian expatriate sportspeople in Hungary
Expatriate footballers in Moldova
Romanian expatriate sportspeople in Moldova
Expatriate footballers in Switzerland
Romanian expatriate sportspeople in Switzerland